The Awarua River is a river of the Northland Region of New Zealand.

References

Rivers of the Northland Region
Rivers of New Zealand
Kaipara Harbour catchment